Brad Watts (born 13 March 1980) is an Australian former professional rugby league footballer who competed in the National Rugby League. He played for the Melbourne Storm from 1999 to 2001, then for the South Sydney Rabbitohs from 2002 to 2005. Watts also played with the Widnes Vikings club in the then Super League in 2005.

Playing career

References

External links
 Brad Watts profile at the South Sydney Rabbitohs official website

1980 births
Living people
Australian rugby league players
Melbourne Storm players
South Sydney Rabbitohs players
People educated at Padua College (Brisbane)
Rugby league fullbacks
Rugby league players from Brisbane
Rugby league wingers
Widnes Vikings players